Rudberg is a surname. Notable people with the surname include:

Agam Rudberg (born 1986), Israeli actress and model
Denise Rudberg (born 1971), Swedish writer
Gunnar Rudberg (1880–1954), Swedish classical philologist
Omar Rudberg, contemporary Swedish musician
Per Rudberg (1922–2010), Swedish Navy vice admiral
Rune Rudberg (born 1961), Norwegian singer
Sten Rudberg (1917–1996), Swedish geographer, son of Gunnar Rudberg